Buchanan County Courthouse may refer to:

Buchanan County Courthouse (Iowa), Independence, Iowa
Buchanan County Courthouse (Missouri), St. Joseph, Missouri
Buchanan County Courthouse (Virginia), Grundy, Virginia